Nikkor is the brand of lenses produced by Nikon Corporation, including camera lenses for the Nikon F-mount.

The Nikkor brand was introduced in 1932, a Westernised rendering of an earlier version Nikkō (日光), an abbreviation  of the company's original full name Nippon Kōgaku ("Japan Optics"; 日本光学工業株式会社). (Nikkō also means "sunlight" and is the name of a Japanese town.) In 1933, Nikon marketed its first camera lens under the Nikkor brand name, the "Aero-NIKKOR," for aerial photography.

Nikon originally reserved the Nikkor designation for its highest-quality imaging optics, but in recent history almost all Nikon lenses are so branded.

Notable Nikkor branded optics have included:
 F-mount lenses for 35mm SLR and DSLR photography (for a full list see Nikon F-mount).
 1-mount lenses for Nikon 1 series cameras.
 Z-mount lenses for Nikon mirrorless cameras.
 Lenses for Zenza Bronica and Plaubel Makina medium format cameras.
 Lenses for Nikon S-mount and Leica rangefinder cameras, as well as very early Canon cameras.
 Amphibious lenses for Nikonos underwater cameras.
 Lenses for large format photography.
 EL-Nikkor photographic enlarger lenses.
 Microscope objectives.
 Industrial lenses, including lenses in support of the Japanese war effort during World War II.

Products

Lenses for Nikon Z-mount

Nikon introduced the Z-mount in 2018 for their system of digital full-frame and APS-C (DX) mirrorless cameras. All of Nikon's Z-mount lenses are Nikkors.

Lenses for Nikon F-mount

Nikkors constitute the majority of lenses available for the Nikon F-mount, which is itself the largest system of interchangeable flange-mount photographic lenses in history. These lenses are designed for the 135 (35mm) and Nikon DX formats. Over 400 different F-mount Nikkor models are known to exist.

Lenses dedicated for other cameras

Note: In the case of the Nikkor wides, "W" just means "wide". Prior to approximately 1976, most Nikon lenses had a suffix appended directly after the "Nikkor" name that was used to denote the number of optical elements in the lens design.

For example, a lens with eight elements would be marked "Nikkor-O", and a lens with eleven elements "Nikkor-UD".

Nikon "S" rangefinder
 Nikkor-O 2.1 cm F4.0
 W-Nikkor 2.5 cm F4.0
 W-Nikkor 2.8 cm F3.5
 W-Nikkor 3.5 cm F1.8
 W-Nikkor 3.5 cm F2.5
 W-Nikkor 3.5 cm F3.5
 Nikkor-N 5 cm F1.1
 Nikkor-S 5 cm F1.4
 Nikkor-H 5 cm F2.0
 Micro-Nikkor-P 5 cm F3.5
 Nikkor-S 8.5 cm F1.5
 Nikkor-P 8.5 cm F2.0

 Nikkor-P 10.5 cm F2.5
 Nikkor-T 10.5 cm F4.0
 Nikkor-Q 13.5 cm F3.5
 Nikkor-Q 13.5 cm F4.0
 Nikkor-H 18 cm F2.5
 Nikkor-Q 25 cm F4.0
 Nikkor-T 35 cm F4.5
 Nikkor-T 50 cm F5.0
 Reflex-Nikkor 100 cm F6.3

Zenza Bronica SLR
 Nikkor-D 40mmF4
 Nikkor-H 50mmF3.5
 Nikkor-O 50mmF2.8
 Nikkor-P 75mmF2.8 (two versions)
 Nikkor-HC 75mmF2.8
 Nikkor-Q 105mmF3.5 LS
 Nikkor-Q 135mmF3.5
 Nikkor-P 200mmF4 (two versions)
 Nikkor-PC 300mmF5.6
 Nikkor-Q 400mmF4.5
 Nikkor-P 600mmF5.6
 Nikkor-P 800mmF8
 Nikkor-P 1200mmF11

Leica "L" rangefinder
 W-Nikkor 35mmF1.8
 W-Nikkor 35mmF2.5
 Nikkor-S 50mmF1.4
 Nikkor-H 50mmF2
 Nikkor-Q 50mmF3.5
 Nikkor-P 85mmF2
 Nikkor-P 105mmF2.5
 Nikkor-Q 135mmF3.5
 Nikkor-P 135mmF3.5

Plaubel Makina
 Nikkor 80mmF2.8 (Makina 67/670)
 Wide Nikkor 55mmF4.5 (Makina W67)

Airesflex TLR
 Nikkor-Q 7.5 cmF3.5 (taking lens)
 View-Nikkor 7.5 cmF3.2 (viewing lens)

Marshal Press
 Nikkor-Q 105mmF3.5

Hansa Canon rangefinder
 "Kasyapa" 50mmF3.5 (origin of this lens uncertain)
 Nikkor 50mmF3.5

Nikonos

Lenses for large format photography

Nikkor-SW
Four-group wide-angle lens series, consisting of six, seven, or eight elements:
 Nikkor-SW 65mmF4
 Nikkor-SW 75mmF4.5
 Nikkor-SW 90mmF4.5
 Nikkor-SW 90mmF8
 Nikkor-SW 120mmF8
 Nikkor-SW 150mmF8

Nikkor-W
Six-element, four-group series:
 Nikkor-W 100mmF5.6
 Nikkor-W 105mmF5.6
 Nikkor-W 135mmF5.6
 Nikkor-W 150mmF5.6
 Nikkor-W 180mmF5.6
 Nikkor-W 210mmF5.6
 Nikkor-W 240mmF5.6
 Nikkor-W 300mmF5.6
 Nikkor-W 360mmF6.5

Nikkor-M
Compact, 4-element, 3-group series.
 Nikkor-M 105mmF3.5
 Nikkor-M 200mmF8
 Nikkor-M 300mmF9
 Nikkor-M 450mmF9

Nikkor-AM
8-element, 4-group true Apochromat macro lens series, optimized for 1:1 reproduction.
 Nikkor-AM*ED 120mmF5.6
 Nikkor-AM*ED 120mmF5.6S
 Nikkor-AM*ED 210mmF5.6

Nikkor-T
Telephoto series. The 360 mm / 600 mm are triple-convertible lenses with 500 mm and 720 mm / 800 mm and 1200 mm interchangeable rear elements which were available separately.
 Nikkor-T ED 270mmF6.3
 Nikkor-T ED 360mmF8
 Nikkor-T ED 500mmF11
 Nikkor-T ED 720mmF16
 Nikkor-T ED 600mmF9
 Nikkor-T ED 800mmF12
 Nikkor-T ED 1200mmF18

Apo-Nikkor
 true Apochromat series, designed for the printing industry, optimized for 1:1 reproduction.
With Waterhouse type Filter Slot.

Apo-Nikkor / Early type
Lens Construction 4 elements in 3 groups / Tessar Type Lenses.
 Apo-Nikkor 12cmF9 (Release of drawing Year : 1961)
 Apo-Nikkor 15cmF9 (Release of drawing Year : 1960) - φ53mmP=0.75 Screw Mount
 Apo-Nikkor 18cmF9 (Release of drawing Year : 1962) - Image circle φ250mm。
 Apo-Nikkor 21cmF9 (Release of drawing Year : 1959)
 Apo-Nikkor 24cmF9 - Image circle φ350mm。
 Apo-Nikkor 30cmF9 (Release of drawing Year : 1949)
 Apo-Nikkor 38cmF9 (Manufacture start Year : 1946)
 Apo-Nikkor-Q.C 45cmF9 (Product Year : 1948) - φ72P=1.0mm Screw Mount
 Apo-Nikkor 60cmF9 (Release of drawing Year : 1948)
 Apo-Nikkor 75cmF9 (Release of drawing Year : 1957)
 Apo-Nikkor 90cmF9 (Release of drawing Year : 1953)

Apo-Nikkor / Later type
Lens Construction 4 elements in 4 groups / Double Gauss Type Lenses.
 Apo-Nikkor 180mmF9 - 7inch. φ53mmP=0.75 Screw Mount. - Image circle φ300mm
 Apo-Nikkor 240mmF9 - 9.5inch. φ53mmP=0.75 Screw Mount. - Image circle φ410mm
 Apo-Nikkor 305mmF9 - 12inch. φ72mmP=1.0mm Screw Mount. - Image circle φ520mm
 Apo-Nikkor 360mmF9 - 14inch. φ72mmP=1.0mm Screw Mount. - Image circle φ600mm
 Apo-Nikkor 420mmF9 - 16.5inch. φ90mmP=1.0mm Screw Mount. - Image circle φ710mm
 Apo-Nikkor 455mmF9 - 18inch. φ90mmP=1.0mm Screw Mount. - Image circle φ770mm
 Apo-Nikkor 480mmF9 - 19inch. φ90mmP=1.0mm Screw Mount. - Image circle φ820mm
 Apo-Nikkor 610mmF11 - 24inch. φ110mmP=1.0mm Screw Mount. - Image circle φ1030mm
 Apo-Nikkor 760mmF11 - 30inch. φ110mmP=1.0mm Screw Mount. - Image circle φ1170mm
 Apo-Nikkor 890mmF11 - 35inch. φ162mmP=1.5mm Screw Mount. - Image circle φ1360mm
 Apo-Nikkor 1210mmF12.5 - 47.5inch. φ162mmP=1.5mm Screw Mount. - Image circle φ1750mm
 Apo-Nikkor 1780mmF14 - 70inch. φ213mmP=1.5mm Screw Mount. - Image circle φ2310mm

Wide-Angle-Apo-Nikkor
Lens Construction 6 elements in 4 groups / Orthometar Type Lenses.
The wide angle version Apo-Nikkor lens was developed for small-scale platemaking cameras.
 W.A.Apo-Nikkor 150mmF8 - φ53mmP=0.75 Screw Mount. - Image circle φ350mm。
 W.A.Apo-Nikkor 210mmF8 - φ72mmP=1.0mm Screw Mount. - Image circle φ460mm。
 W.A.Apo-Nikkor 240mmF10
 W.A.Apo-Nikkor 300mmF9 - φ90mmP=1.0mm Screw Mount. - Image circle φ610mm。
 W.A.Apo-Nikkor 360mmF9 - φ90mmP=1.0mm Screw Mount. - Image circle φ730mm

Photographic enlarging lenses

EL-Nikkor
The EL-Nikkor series of lenses are designed for photographic enlargers. Most feature 39mm Leica thread mounts, although some feature a 50mm screw mount. Most are 6-element, 4-group designs. Some slower, lower-cost designs (marked †) are 4-element, 3-group designs. Newer versions of these lenses are marked with an "N" (focal lengths to 105mm) or "A" (focal lengths from 135mm). (Per Nikon, Inc. Technical and Service Support (800-645-6689), manufacture and sale of all enlarging lenses has been discontinued.)
 EL-Nikkor 40mmF4
 EL-Nikkor 5cmF2.8/50mmF2.8 (Release of drawing Year : 1956) - M39 Screw Mount.
 EL-Nikkor 5cmF3.5C - "El-NIKKOR-C"
 EL-Nikkor 5cmF3.5 (Release of drawing Year : 1945)
 EL-Nikkor 50mmF4† (Release of drawing Year : 1967) - M39 Screw Mount.
 Helmes 5.5cmF3.5 (Release of drawing Year : 1936) - Tessar Type
 EL-Nikkor 63mmF2.8
 EL-Nikkor 6.3 cm/63mmF3.5(Sale Year : 1966) - M39 Screw Mount.
 EL-Nikkor 68mmF3.5 - M39 Screw Mount.
 EL-Nikkor 75mmF4 †
 EL-Nikkor 80mmF5.6(Sale Year : 1966) - M39 Screw Mount. (Lens Construction 6 elements in 4 groups / Orthometar Type Lens)

 EL-Nikkor 105mmF5.6(Sale Year : 1966) - M39 Screw Mount. (Lens Construction 6 elements in 4 groups / Orthometar Type Lens)
 EL-Nikkor 135mmF5.6(Sale Year : 1966) - M39 Screw Mount & φ45mmP=0.5 Screw Mount. (Lens Construction 6 elements in 4 groups / Orthometar Type Lens)
 EL-Nikkor 150mmF5.6(Sale Year : 1968) - φ53mmP=0.75 Screw Mount. (Lens Construction 6 elements in 4 groups / Orthometar Type Lens)
 EL-Nikkor 180mmF5.6(Sale Year : 1972) - φ62mmP=1 Screw Mount. (Lens Construction 6 elements in 4 groups / Orthometar Type Lens)
 EL-Nikkor 210mmF5.6(Sale Year : 1968) - φ72mmP=1 Screw Mount. (Lens Construction 6 elements in 4 groups / Orthometar Type Lens)
 EL-Nikkor 240mmF5.6(Sale Year : 1972) - φ82mmP=1 Screw Mount. (Lens Construction 6 elements in 4 groups / Orthometar Type Lens)
 EL-Nikkor 300mmF5.6(Sale Year : 1972) - φ100mmP=1 Screw Mount. (Lens Construction 6 elements in 4 groups / Orthometar Type Lens)
 EL-Nikkor 360mmF5.6(Sale Year : 1972) - φ130mmP=1.5 Screw Mount. (Lens Construction 6 elements in 4 groups / Orthometar Type Lens)

EL-Nikkor N
 EL-Nikkor 40mmF4N(Sale Year : 1984) - M39 Screw Mount. (Lens Construction 6 elements in 4 groups / Biogon Type Lens)
 EL-Nikkor 50mmF2.8N - M39 Screw Mount. (Lens Construction 6 elements in 4 groups / Double Gauss Type Lens)
 EL-Nikkor 50mmF4N - M39 Screw Mount. (Lens Construction 4 elements in 3 groups / Tessar Type Lens)
 EL-Nikkor 63mmF2.8N - M39 Screw Mount. (Lens Construction 6 elements in 4 groups / EL-Nikkor Type Lens)
 EL-Nikkor 75mmF4N - M39 Screw Mount. (Lens Construction 4 elements in 3 groups / Tessar Type Lens) 
 EL-Nikkor 80mmF5.6N - M39 Screw Mount. (Lens Construction 6 elements in 4 groups / Orthometar Type Lens)
 EL-Nikkor 105mmF5.6N - M39 Screw Mount. (Lens Construction 6 elements in 4 groups / Orthometar Type Lens)

EL-Nikkor A
 EL-Nikkor 135mmF5.6A - M39 Screw Mount & φ50mmP=0.75 Screw Mount. (Lens Construction 6 elements in 4 groups)
 EL-Nikkor 150mmF5.6A - M39 Screw Mount & φ50mmP=0.75 Screw Mount. (Lens Construction 6 elements in 4 groups)
 EL-Nikkor 180mmF5.6A - φ72mmP=1 Screw Mount. (Lens Construction 6 elements in 4 groups)
 EL-Nikkor 210mmF5.6A - φ72mmP=1 Screw Mount. (Lens Construction 6 elements in 4 groups)
 EL-Nikkor 240mmF5.6A - φ90mmP=1 Screw Mount. (Lens Construction 6 elements in 4 groups) 
 EL-Nikkor 300mmF5.6A - φ90mmP=1 Screw Mount. (Lens Construction 6 elements in 4 groups)

Apo-EL-Nikkor
The Apo-EL-Nikkor series of lenses are true Apochromat photo enlarging lenses with chromatic aberration corrected not only for the entire visible range of the spectrum, but also in near ultraviolet and near infrared ranges (380-700 nm). They are all 8-element, 4-group designs with maximum-minimum aperture of 5.6-45.

 Apo-EL-Nikkor 105mmF5.6
 Apo-EL-Nikkor 170mmF5.6
 Apo-EL-Nikkor 210mmF5.6
 Apo-EL-Nikkor 300mmF5.6
 Apo-EL-Nikkor 480mmF5.6

Apo-EL-Nikkor N
 Apo-EL-Nikkor 105mmF5.6N
 Apo-EL-Nikkor 210mmF5.6N

EL-Zoom-Nikkor
 EL-Zoom-Nikkor 45-91mmF5.6-11.4 - Mount φ86mm (Lens Construction 15 elements in 12 groups)
 EL-Zoom-Nikkor 77-111mmF5.6-9.8 - Mount φ125mm (Lens Construction 10 elements in 10 groups)

Ortho-EL-Nikkor
 Ortho-EL-Nikkor 105mmF5.6
 Ortho-EL-Nikkor 135mmF5.6

For industrial use and the special lens

Fax-Nikkor
 Fax-Nikkor 160mmF5.6 - φ62mmP=0.75 Screw Mount. (Lens Construction 6 elements in 4 groups)
 Fax-Nikkor 210mmF5.6 - φ72mmP=1.0 Screw Mount. (Lens Construction 6 elements in 4 groups)
 Fax-Nikkor 210mmF7
 Fax-Nikkor 260mmF10 - (Lens Construction 4 elements in 4 groups / Topogon Type Lens)
 Fax-Nikkor 300mmF7 - φ95mmP=1.0 Screw Mount.

Fax-Ortho-Nikkor
 Fax-Ortho-Nikkor 250mmF5.6
 Fax-Ortho-Nikkor 400mmF5.6 - (Lens Construction 6 elements in 4 groups)
 Fax-Ortho-Nikkor 500mmF5.6

Fish-Eye-Nikkor
 Fish-Eye-Nikkor 16.3mmF8 - (March, 1941 manufacture)

Pro-Fish-Eye-Nikkor
 Pro-Fish-Eye-Nikkor 2mm F1.5 - (Projection Lens)

Aero-Nikkor
The lens for aerial photographs produced at prewar days

Aero-Nikkor
 Aero-Nikkor 7.5 cm F3.5 (Sale Year : 1937)
 Aero-Nikkor 10 cm F5.6 (Sale Year : 1939) 
 Aero-Nikkor 18 cm F4.5 (Sale Year : 1933) 
 Aero-Nikkor 20 cm F3.5
 Aero-Nikkor 50 cm F4.8 (Sale Year : 1932) - (Lens Construction 3 elements in 3 groups)
 Aero-Nikkor 70 cm F5 (Sale Year : 1932) - (Lens Construction 3 elements in 3 groups)

R-Aero-Nikkor
 R-Aero-Nikkor 50cmF5.6

COM-Nikkor
for Computer Output Microfilming Lens
 COM-Nikkor 37mmF1.4 - M39 Screw Mount. (Lens Construction 8 elements in 6 groups)
 COM-Nikkor 88mmF2

CRT-Nikkor
for Oscilloscope Output Microfilming Lens
 Oscillo-Nikkor 55mmF1.2/CRT-Nikkor 55mmF1.2 - M39 Screw Mount. (Lens Construction 8 elements in 6 groups)
 CRT-Nikkor 58mmF1.0 - Nikon F Mount.

Micro-Nikkor
 Micro-Nikkor 55mm f3.5
 Micro-Nikkor 70mmF5 - M39 Screw Mount. (Lens Construction 5 elements in 4 groups / Xenotar Type Lens)
 Micro-Nikkor 150mmF5.6 - φ72mmP=1 Screw Mount.

Ultra-Micro-Nikkor
for Microfilming Lens
 Ultra-Micro-Nikkor 28mmF1.7e - M39 Screw Mount. (Lens Construction 10 elements in 8 groups)
 Ultra-Micro-Nikkor 28mmF1.7g - M39 Screw Mount. (Lens Construction 10 elements in 8 groups)
 Ultra-Micro-Nikkor 28mmF1.8(Sale Year : 1965) - M39 Screw Mount. (Lens Construction 9 elements in 7 groups)
 Ultra-Micro-Nikkor 28mmF1.8e - M39 Screw Mount. (Lens Construction 9 elements in 7 groups)
 Ultra-Micro-Nikkor 28mmF1.8h(Sale Year : 1967) - M39 Screw Mount. (Lens Construction 9 elements in 7 groups)
 Ultra-Micro-Nikkor 29.5mmF1.2(Sale Year : 1964) - (Lens Construction 9 elements in 6 groups, used fluorite.)
 Ultra-Micro-Nikkor 30mmF1.2 -  M39 Screw Mount, φ50mmP=0.75 Screw Mount & φ55mmP=0.75 Screw Mount. (Lens Construction 9 elements in 6 groups)
 Ultra-Micro-Nikkor 30mmF1.2h(Sale Year : 1969) - M39 Screw Mount.  (Lens Construction 9 elements in 6 groups)
 Ultra-Micro-Nikkor 50mmF1.8e(Sale Year : 1969) - φ52mmP=1 Screw Mount. (Lens Construction 12 elements in 9 groups)
 Ultra-Micro-Nikkor 50mmF1.8h(Sale Year : 1969) - φ52mmP=1 Screw Mount. (Lens Construction 12 elements in 9 groups)
 Ultra-Micro-Nikkor 55mmF2(Sale Year : 1965) - M39 Screw Mount.
 Ultra-Micro-Nikkor 55mmF2h(Sale Year : 1967) - M39 Screw Mount.
 Ultra-Micro-Nikkor 125mmF2.8(Sale Year : 1965) - φ62mmP=1 Screw Mount. (Lens Construction 7 elements in 6 groups)
 Ultra-Micro-Nikkor 135mmF4(Sale Year : 1965) - φ62mmP=1 Screw Mount. (Lens Construction 7 elements in 4 groups)
 Ultra-Micro-Nikkor 155mmF4 - φ72mmP=1 Screw Mount. (Lens Construction 7 elements in 4 groups)
 Ultra-Micro-Nikkor 225mmF1g(Sale Year : 1969) - φ122mmP=1 Screw Mount.
 Ultra-Micro-Nikkor 250mmF4
 Ultra-Micro-Nikkor 300mmF1.4g(Sale Year : 1969) - φ122mmP=1 Screw Mount.

Macro-Nikkor
The interchangeable lens only for large-sized macro photography equipment "Multiphot"
 Macro-Nikkor 19mmF2.8 - RMS Mount.
 Macro-Nikkor 35mmF4.5 - RMS Mount.
 Macro-Nikkor 65mmF4.5 - M39 Screw Mount.
 Macro-Nikkor 12cmF6.3 - M39 Screw Mount.

Printing-Nikkor
Was developed as an optical lens for printing, as demand occurs after the line sensor lenses. Thoroughly eliminate various aberrations in the reference scale, with a high color fidelity and resolution. Has now been redesigned for the Eco-glass, like the current product.

Printing-Nikkor
 Printing-Nikkor 75mmF2.8 - (Lens Construction 12 elements in 4 groups)
 Printing-Nikkor 95mmF2.8 - (Lens Construction 12 elements in 4 groups)
 Printing-Nikkor 105mmF2.8 - (Lens Construction 12 elements in 4 groups)
 Printing-Nikkor 150mmF2.8 - (Lens Construction 10 elements in 4 groups)

Printing-Nikkor N
 Printing-Nikkor 150mmF2.8N

Printing-Nikkor A
 Printing-Nikkor 95mmF2.8A - φ45mmP=0.75 Screw Mount.
 Printing-Nikkor 105mmF2.8A - φ45mmP=0.75 Screw Mount.

Process-Nikkor
The lens for table type small platemaking cameras. Lens Construction 4 elements in 4 groups. Topogon Type Lens.
Standard magnification is ×1.
A 400 to 650 nm chromatic aberration compensation wavelength band.
 Process-Nikkor 180mmF10 - φ62mmP=1.0 Screw Mount.
 Process-Nikkor 210mmF10 - φ72mmP=1.0 Screw Mount.
 Process-Nikkor 240mmF10 - φ82mmP=1.0 Screw Mount.
 Process-Nikkor 260mmF10 - φ90mmP=1.0 Screw Mount.

Rayfact
It is an industrial lens brand of Tochigi-Nikon.
He does not declare himself Nikkor.

Rayfact
 Rayfact ×7 OFM70350HN-TS - φ72mmP=0.75 Screw Mount.
 Rayfact ×7 OFM70350HN-TS - φ72mmP=0.75 Screw Mount.
 Rayfact ×3.5 OFM35162MN - φ67mmP=0.75 Screw Mount.
 Rayfact ×2 OFM20119MN(Sale Year : 2006) - φ45mmP=0.75 Screw Mount.
 Rayfact ×1 OFM10090MN(Sale Year : 2006) - φ45mmP=0.75 Screw Mount.
 Rayfact PF10545MF-UV - The succeeding kind which made "Ai UV-Nikkor 105mmF4.5S" eco-glass specification.
 Rayfact 25mmF1.4(Sale Year : 2001) - C Mount.

Rayfact IL
The succeeding kind of "EL-Nikkor" which ended sale in 2006.
 Rayfact IL40mm PF4040ML(Sale Year : 2007) - M39 Screw Mount.
 Rayfact IL50mm PF5028ML(Sale Year : 2007) - M39 Screw Mount.
 Rayfact IL63mm OF6328ML(Sale Year : 2007) - M39 Screw Mount.

Rayfact VL
The succeeding kind of "Printing-Nikkor".
Use by a line sensor was designed as a premise from the beginning.
 Rayfact VL ×0.5 OFM05042MN - Real focus distance 119.3mm
 Rayfact VL ×0.7 OFM07052MN - Real focus distance 121.0mm
 Rayfact VL ×1 OFM10064MN - Real focus distance 123.9mm
 Rayfact VL ×1.4 OFM14074MN - Real focus distance 121.0mm

Repro-Nikkor
It is designed supposing the use as x1 copy or a relay lens.
 FR-Nikkor 75mmF1.0
 Repro-Nikkor 85mmF1.0 - φ53mmP=0.75 Screw Mount. (Lens Construction 12 elements in 8 groups)
 Repro-Nikkor 100mmF2.8
 Repro-Nikkor 170mmF1.4 - φ73mmP=0.75 Screw Mount. (Lens Construction 10 elements in 6 groups)

Regno-Nikkor
The lens for X-rays indirect photograph equipment.
 Regno-Nikkor 10cmF1.5

TV-Nikkor
The lens for fluoroscopy of an X-ray.
 TV-Nikkor 35mmF0.9 - M39 Screw Mount. (Lens Construction 9 elements in 7 groups)

Xero-Nikkor
The lens for about doubling the enlarging radiography of the documents displayed on CRT.
 Xero-Nikkor 13.5cmF2 / 135mmF2
 New Xero-Nikkor 135mmF2

Zoom Nikkor
Nikon Nikkor 28–45 mm f/ 4.5 is a rare lens designed for landscape photography. The lens was introduced in August 1975, and was stopped some years later. It has seven diaphragm blades. The lens is rather sharp, has normal contrast, and corrects for geometric distortion. The bokeh is inexpressive in comparison to other wide angle Nikkor's lenses.

See also
Rokkor
Fujinon
Takumar
Zuiko
Yashinon
Yashikor
Nikon F-mount
List of Nikon F-mount lenses with integrated autofocus motors

References

External links
Nikon rangefinder lens information and price guide
A brief history of Nikkor lenses
Nikkor lenses and serial numbers
Nikkor lens acronyms explained
Links to information about Nikkor lenses
"Red Book" of industrial and other rare Nikkor lenses
Nikkor lenses for medium format
Nikon lenses for Leica
Leica mount lenses (includes Nikkors)
Lenses for Nikon rangefinder mount

Photographic lenses by brand
Nikon lenses
Japanese brands